Gilgo is a hamlet and census-designated place (CDP) in the Town of Babylon in Suffolk County, New York, United States. The population was 131 at the 2010 census.

Prior to the 2010 census, the area was part of a larger CDP called Gilgo-Oak Beach-Captree. The Gilgo CDP contains several small beach communities on a barrier island along the southern edge of Long Island. In order from west to east, these include West Gilgo (on the Nassau/Suffolk county border), Gilgo Beach, and Cedar Beach (no residences). To the east along the beach is the CDP of Oak Beach.

Geography

Demographics

The census numbers are presumably for full-time inhabitants; many of these houses are second homes and not primary residences, although the proportion of seasonal residents is decreasing.

The land for these communities is not privately owned, but leased from the State of New York through the year 2050. However, the residences on the property are owned.  If the leases are not renewed at some point in the future, the owners will have to move the houses elsewhere, similar to what happened at High Hill Beach when Jones Beach State Park was created.

As of the census of 2010, the racial makeup of the CDP was 100.0% White. 2.3% of the population reported Hispanic or Latino ancestry.

The population was spread out, with 19.8% under age 18, 4.6% from 18 to 24, 16.0% from 25 to 44, 39.7% from 45 to 64, and 19.8% over 64.

The median income for a household in the CDP was $154,934, and the median income for a family was $154,276. The per capita income for the CDP was $67,428. None of the families or the population were below the poverty line.

References

Babylon (town), New York
Beaches of Suffolk County, New York
Robert Moses projects
Census-designated places in New York (state)
Census-designated places in Suffolk County, New York
Populated coastal places in New York (state)